The commune of Gisagara is a commune of Cankuzo Province in north-eastern Burundi. The capital lies at Gisagara.

References

Communes of Burundi
Cankuzo Province